Raja Minyin Pru (also spelt Men Rai Pru) was the grandson of King Nanda Bayin and great-grandson of Bayinnaung. He was the 2nd Governor of the Bohmong Circle (modern-day Bandarban District) from 1631 to 1665 succeeded from his father Maung Saw Pru, 1st Governor of the Bohmong Circle.

He married and had son, Hari Pru, 3rd Governor of the Bohmong Circle from 1665 to 1687.

External links 
Bohmong Chief and King

References

Monarchs of Mrauk-U
17th century in Burma
17th-century monarchs in Asia